The Wolf number (also known as the relative sunspot number or Zürich number) is a quantity that measures the number of sunspots and groups of sunspots present on the surface of the Sun.

History 
Astronomers have been observing the Sun recording information about sunspots since the advent of the telescope in 1609.
However, the idea of compiling the information about the sunspot number from various observers originates in Rudolf Wolf in 1848 in Zürich, Switzerland. The produced series initially had his name, but now it is more commonly referred to as the international sunspot number series.

The international sunspot number series is still being produced today at the observatory of Brussels. The international number series shows an approximate periodicity of 11 years, the solar cycle, which was first found by Heinrich Schwabe in 1843, thus sometimes it is also referred to as the Schwabe cycle. The periodicity is not constant but varies roughly in the range 9.5 to 11 years. The international sunspot number series extends back to 1700 with annual values while daily values exist only since 1818.

Since 1 July 2015 a revised and updated international sunspot number series has been made available.  The biggest difference is an overall increase by a factor of 1.6 to the entire series.  Traditionally, a scaling of 0.6 was applied to all sunspot counts after 1893, to compensate for Alfred Wolfer's better equipment, after taking over from Wolf.  This scaling has been dropped from the revised series, making modern counts closer to their raw values.  Also, counts were reduced slightly after 1947 to compensate for bias introduced by a new counting method adopted that year, in which sunspots are weighted according to their size.

Calculation
The relative sunspot number  is computed using the formula
 
where
  is the number of individual spots,
  is the number of sunspot groups, and
  is a factor that varies with observer and is referred to as the observatory factor or the personal reduction coefficient.
The observatory factor compensates for the differing number of recorded individual sunspots and sunspot groups by different observers. These differences in recorded values occur due to differences in instrumentation, local seeing, personal experience, and other factors between observers. Since Wolf was the primary observer for the relative sunspot number, his observatory factor was 1.

Smoothed monthly mean
To calculate the 13-month smoothed monthly mean sunspot number, which is commonly used to calculate the minima and maxima of solar cycles, a tapered-boxcar smoothing function is used.
 
where  is the monthly sunspot number  months away from month .

Alternative series
The accuracy of the compilation of the group sunspot number series has been questioned, motivating the development of several alternative series suggesting different behavior of sunspot group activity before the 20th century.
However, indirect indices of solar activity favor the group sunspot number series by Chatzistergos T. et al.

A different index of sunspot activity was introduced in 1998 in the form of the number of groups apparent on the solar disc.
With this index it was made possible to include sunspot data acquired since 1609, being the date of the invention of the telescope.

See also
 Solar variation
 Joy's law (astronomy)

References

External links
 The Exploratorium's Guide to Sunspots
 Solar Influences Data Analysis Center (SIDC) for the Sunspot Index
 NASA Solar Physics Sunspot Cycle page and Table of Sunspot Numbers (txt) by month since 1749 CE

Stellar phenomena
Solar phenomena

de:Sonnenfleck#Sonnenflecken-Relativzahl